Maoritomella moderata is an extinct species of sea snail, a marine gastropod mollusk in the family Borsoniidae.

Description

Distribution
This extinct marine species from the Upper Cenozoic was found in New Zealand

References

 Marwick, John. Upper Cenozoic Mollusca of Wairoa District, Hawkeś Bay. New Zealand Department of Scientific and Industrial Research, New Zealand Geological Survey, 1965.
 Maxwell, P.A. (2009). Cenozoic Mollusca. pp. 232–254 in Gordon, D.P. (ed.) New Zealand inventory of biodiversity. Volume one. Kingdom Animalia: Radiata, Lophotrochozoa, Deuterostomia. Canterbury University Press, Christchurch.

External links
 Image at the Museum of New Zealand TE PAPA TONGAREWA

moderata
Gastropods of New Zealand
Gastropods described in 1965